Thomas Ewing Sr. (December 28, 1789October 26, 1871) was a National Republican and Whig politician from Ohio. He served in the U.S. Senate as well as serving as the secretary of the treasury and the first secretary of the interior.  He is also known as the foster father (and subsequently father-in-law) of famous American Civil War general William Tecumseh Sherman.

Biography
Born in West Liberty, Ohio County, Virginia (now West Virginia), he was the son of American Revolutionary War veteran George Ewing. After studying at Ohio University and reading law under Philemon Beecher, Ewing began practicing law in Lancaster, Ohio, in 1816. In 1824, he was joined in that practice by Henry Stanbery.

As a colorful country lawyer, he was elected to the U.S. Senate in 1830 as a Whig and served a single term. He was unsuccessful in seeking a second term in 1836. Ewing served as Secretary of the Treasury in 1841, serving under Presidents William Henry Harrison and John Tyler. He resigned on September 11, 1841, along with the entire cabinet (except Secretary of State Daniel Webster), in protest of Tyler's veto of the Banking Act.

Ewing was later appointed to serve as the first Secretary of the Interior by President Zachary Taylor. Ewing served in the position from March 8, 1849 to July 22, 1850 under Taylor and Millard Fillmore. As James G. Blaine later wrote:

As first secretary, Ewing consolidated bureaus from various Departments, such as the Land Office from the Treasury Department and the Indian Bureau from the War Department.  The bureaus were being kicked out of their offices as unwanted tenants in their former departments. However, the Interior Department had no office space, so Ewing rented space. Later, the Patent Office building, with a new east wing, provided permanent space in 1852. Ewing initiated the Interior Department's culture of corruption by wholesale replacement of officials with political patronage. Newspapers called him "Butcher Ewing" for his efforts.

In 1850, Ewing was appointed to the Senate to fill the vacancy created by the resignation of Thomas Corwin, and served from July 20, 1850 – March 3, 1851. Ewing was unsuccessful in seeking re-election in 1850. In 1861, Ewing served as one of Ohio's delegates to the peace conference held in Washington in hopes of staving off civil war. Ewing was a defendant of slavery at this conference, and frequently deflected attacks on the institution by Britain, stating that 'we have no slavery or misery to be compared with that existing in the India provinces.'  After the war, Ewing was appointed by President Andrew Johnson to a third cabinet post as Secretary of War in 1868 following the firing of Edwin M. Stanton but the Senate, still outraged at Johnson's firing of Stanton – which had provoked Johnson's impeachment – refused to act on the nomination.

Ewing married Maria Wills Boyle, a Roman Catholic, and raised their children in her faith. His foster son was the famous general William Tecumseh Sherman. Sherman eventually married Thomas Ewing Sr.'s daughter, Ellen Ewing Sherman. Ewing's namesake son, Thomas Ewing Jr., was an American Civil War Union army general and two-term U.S. Congressman from Ohio.  Two of Ewing's other sons – Hugh Boyle Ewing and Charles Ewing – also became generals in the Union army during the Civil War.

Ewing was born a Presbyterian, but for many years attended Catholic services with his family.  He was formally baptized into the Catholic faith during his last illness.

Ewing remained a Whig following his joining of the party in 1833, even when the national Whig Party collapsed and was replaced by the Republican Party. This makes Ewing one of the only federal politicians to remain a member the Whig Party when many others bolted to the Republican or American parties.    

Prior to his death on October 26, 1871, Ewing had been the last surviving member of the Harrison and Tyler Cabinets. Future President and Governor of Ohio Rutherford B. Hayes was a pallbearer at his funeral. He is buried in Saint Mary Cemetery, Lancaster, Fairfield County, Ohio.

See also
Unsuccessful nominations to the Cabinet of the United States

References

Further reading
Memorial of Thomas Ewing, of Ohio (New York: Catholic Publication Society, 1873), compiled by his daughter, Ellen Ewing Sherman.
Lewis, Lloyd, Sherman: Fighting Prophet (New York: Harcourt, Brace & Co., 1932)
Miller, Paul I., "Thomas Ewing, Last of the Whigs," Ph.D. diss., Ohio State University, 1933.
Heineman, Kenneth J. Civil War Dynasty: The Ewing Family of Ohio, (New York: New York University Press, 2012).

External links

Ewing Family History Pages
Catholic Encyclopedia information

1789 births
1871 deaths
19th-century American politicians
People from West Liberty, West Virginia
Ewing family (politics and military)
Catholics from West Virginia
Converts to Roman Catholicism from Presbyterianism
United States Secretaries of the Treasury
William Henry Harrison administration cabinet members
Tyler administration cabinet members
United States Secretaries of the Interior
Taylor administration cabinet members
National Republican Party United States senators from Ohio
Whig Party United States senators from Ohio
Ohio National Republicans
Ohio Whigs
Rejected or withdrawn nominees to the United States Executive Cabinet
American lawyers admitted to the practice of law by reading law
Ohio lawyers
Ohio University alumni